Miquela Sousa, or Lil Miquela, is a fictional American character created by Trevor McFedries and Sara DeCou. The project began in 2016 as an Instagram profile. The account details a fictional narrative which presents Miquela as a CGI character and model in conflict with other digital projects while marketing a variety of brands, primarily in fashion. As a marketing tool, Miquela has been featured in product endorsements for streetwear and luxury brands such as Calvin Klein and Prada. The account amassed more than a million followers in its first two years.  Miquela has over 2.8 million instagram followers.

Origins
The character Miquela is a teenaged Instagram model from Downey, California. Miquela's first Instagram post was made on April 23, 2016. British model Emily Bador was rumored to be Miquela; Bador has denied managing the account but openly acknowledged the physical similarity between herself and the character.

In April 2018, Brud, a Los Angeles-based startup led by McFedries, announced that it was the creator of both the character and the Instagram account.

Storyline
Miquela Sousa was created with the background of being a Brazilian-American 19-year-old. She has accounts on Twitter, Tumblr, and Instagram. She is also active on YouTube and TikTok 

In April 2018, a second, similar character known as Bermuda "hacked" the Miquela account, deleting all photos of Miquela and replacing them with photos of the Bermuda character. Miquela and Bermuda were then revealed to both be characters created by Trevor McFedries and Sara Decou of Brud. The two online personas then began posting pictures together, and eventually the account was again run by Miquela's team. This narrative positioned the Miquela character as a social justice activist. In 2020, Miquela "consciously uncoupled" from her "human" boyfriend as a part of the storyline.

Fashion collaborations
The character has been pictured with a number of celebrities including Diplo, Molly Soda, Millie Bobby Brown, Nile Rogers, Shane Dawson, Samantha Urbani and Pabllo Vittar.[8] She has been "interviewed" or profiled in a number of publications including Refinery29, Vogue, Buzzfeed, v-files, Nylon, the Guardian, Business of Fashion, and The Cut. She appeared on the cover of Highsnobiety in April 2018. 

She has also been featured in the magazines V and Paper.In February 2018, the character did an Instagram takeover for Prada as part of Milan Fashion Week. On May 16, she did a Calvin Klein ad with Bella Hadid, in which both were animated, in addition to a collaboration with Samsung. That year Miquela was hired as a contributing arts editor to the magazine Dazed. In 2020, Miquela became the first digital avatar to sign with a talent agency when a contract was signed with CAA—becoming its first virtual client. It was discovered at the time that Miquela had previously been represented by WME.

Online presence
The character has been pictured with a number of celebrities including Diplo, Molly Soda, Millie Bobby Brown, Nile Rogers, Shane Dawson, Samantha Urbani and Pabllo Vittar. and has been "interviewed" or profiled in a number of publications including Refinery29, Vogue, BuzzFeed, v-files, Nylon, the Guardian, Business of Fashion, and The Cut. It appeared on the cover of Highsnobiety in April 2018. In February 2018, the character did an Instagram takeover for Prada as part of Milan Fashion Week. On May 16, it did a Calvin Klein ad with Bella Hadid, in which both were animated. They were shown kissing each other, which sparked accusations of queer-baiting. Calvin Klein then went on to apologize amidst the deep criticism, stating that their concept was to "promote freedom of expression for a wide range of identities, including a spectrum of gender and sexual identities".

In April 2018, a second, similar character known as Bermuda "hacked" into the Miquela account, deleting all photos of Miquela and replacing them with photos of the Bermuda character. Lil Miquela and Bermuda were then revealed to both be characters created by Trevor McFedries and Sara Decou of Brud. The two online personas then began posting pictures together, and eventually the account was again run by Miquela's team.

This narrative positioned the Miquela character as a social justice activist, something considered problematic when seen in tandem with its use as a marketing tool.

During 2019 Coachella, she took a picture with Spanish singer Rosalía.

Discography

Singles

Guest appearances

Music career
Trevor McFedries, a cofounder of Brud, is a music producer and DJed known as Yung Skeeter. The use of Miquela as a virtual musician has been compared to Gorillaz and Hatsune Miku. In August 2017, Miquela released its first single, "Not Mine".

The Miquela character has released several singles since its debut with "Not Mine", including "You Should be Alone", "Over You", "Right Back", and a collaboration with Baauer titled "Hate Me". It released two new singles on July 31 called "Money" and "Sleeping In".

Social impact 
In June 2018, Miquela was named one of Time’s 25 Most Influential People on the Internet along with fellow fashion peers DietPrada (duo composed of Lindsey Schuyler and Tony Liu) and celebrated musicians Rihanna and BTS.

See also
 Virtual influencer

References

External links
 Lil Miquela on Instagram

Virtual influencers
Instagram accounts
Fictional musicians
Fictional characters introduced in 2016